Jannaschia confluentis is a Gram-negative, aerobic, and non-motile bacterium from the genus of Jannaschia which has been isolated from the Jeju Island in Korea.

References

Rhodobacteraceae
Bacteria described in 2018